Jan Nepomucen Białobłocki (180631 March 1828, Sokołowo, Golub-Dobrzyń) was a childhood friend and correspondent of  Polish-French composer Frédéric Chopin.

Born into an aristocratic family, Białobłocki began in 1816 to study at the Warsaw Lyceum, where one of his teachers was Nicolas Chopin, the composer's father; Białobłocki lodged with the Chopin family. In 1823 Białobłocki commenced studies at Warsaw University. He became a close friend of Frédéric, who addressed numerous letters to him, using Białobłocki's nickname, Jasio.

In 1828 Białobłocki died of tuberculosis of the bone, unmarried, at his family estate of Sokołowo.

References
Notes

Sources
Mysłakowski, Peter, and Andrzej Sikorski (2007), Jan Białobłocki, in Fryderyk Chopin Institute website, accessed 14 February 2014.
 Walker, Alan (2018). Fryderyk Chopin: A Life and Times. London: Faber and Faber. 

1800s births
1828 deaths
19th-century Polish people
University of Warsaw alumni
Frédéric Chopin
19th-century composers
19th-century Polish musicians